Aero Vodochody (commonly referred to as Aero) is a Czech aircraft company. Its main production facilities are located at Vodochody Airport in the Prague-East District, on the municipal territories of Vodochody and Odolena Voda.

During the Cold War era, the firm was well known for its range of jet-powered trainer aircraft, the L-29 Delfin and L-39 Albatros. It also developed derivatives of the L-39, the L-59 Super Albatros and the L-159 Alca military light combat jet. Aero Vodochody is believed to have handled the biggest aircraft industrial programme to take place across any of the Council for Mutual Economic Assistance (COMECON) countries except for the Soviet Union itself. Following the fall of the communist government in Czechoslovakia during 1989, Aero Vodochody experienced a disruptive period of business, having lost a major portion of the market for its jet trainers. Sales noticeably declined during the 1990s in Eastern Europe as well as in NATO countries as a result of the peace dividend.

Between 1998 and 2004, Aero Vodochody was controlled by the American aerospace company Boeing. During October 2006, the company was privatised once again, being bought by Czech-Slovak investment group Penta Investments for roughly 3 billion CZK. Aero Vodochody continues to manufacture both whole aircraft and aerostructures for the aerospace industry. During the 2014 Farnborough Airshow, it announced the launch of the Aero L-39NG, an upgraded and modernised version of its ubiquitous L-39.

In year 2021 Penta Investments sold their business share to the HSC Aerojet Zrt.

History

Aero Vodochody has been active since its founding in 1919. Between 1929 and 1951, its subsidiary, Aero, manufactured a range of small and medium-sized cars with two-stroke engines, it also briefly produced the Škoda 150 truck between 1946 and 1947 under licence.

During the 1950s, Aero Vodochody developed the L-29 Delfin trainer aircraft; it was Czechoslovakia's first indigenously designed jet-powered aircraft. The L-29 is believed to have likely been the biggest aircraft industrial programme to take place across any of the Council for Mutual Economic Assistance (COMECON) countries except for the Soviet Union itself. During the course of the programme, in excess of 3,000 L-29s were produced; of these, around 2,000 were reported to have been delivered to the Soviet Union, where it served as the standard trainer for the Soviet Air Force. Of the others, which included both armed and unarmed models, many aircraft were delivered to the various COMECON countries while others were exported to various overseas nations, including Egypt, Syria, Indonesia, Nigeria and Uganda. Reportedly, the type has been used in active combat during several instances, perhaps the most high-profile being the Nigerian Civil War of the late 1960s and of Egyptian L-29s against Israeli tanks during the brief Yom Kippur War of 1973.

The L-39 Albatros was designed during the 1960s as a replacement for the Aero L-29 Delfín as a principal training aircraft. Several specialised variants of the base L-39 design were quickly introduced. In 1972, a purpose-built target tug variant, the L-39V, conducted its initial flight. During 1975, the first L-39ZO training/light combat model, which was equipped with four underwing hardpoints as well as a strengthened wing and modified landing gear, performed its first flight. In 1977, the first L-39ZA light combat variant, which was fitted with a single Gryazev-Shipunov GSh-23 cannon mounted underneath the fuselage in addition to the four hardpoints and strengthening of the L-39ZO, made its maiden flight. According to aerospace publication Flight International, roughly 200 L-39s were being sold each year upon the jet trainer market during the late 1980s. Sales of the L-39 declined during the 1990s. This downturn has been attributed to the loss of the captive Warsaw Pact trainer market, to which a substantial proportion of the total aircraft manufactured had been historically sold to; allegations about Czechoslovak banks being unable to finance the defense industry and inaction on the part of the Czechoslovak government; and concerns over the quality of manufacturing standards. During 1996, production of the L-39 was terminated.

Aero Vodochody has developed several improved variants of the L-39 to take its place, and has continued extensive support and overhaul operations for existing L-39 customers. The L-59 Super Albatros was derived from the L-39, being originally designated as the L-39MS. Aero only produced a handful of L-59s before discontinuing production. Another derivative of the L-39 Albatros was the L-159 Alca, a modernised combat-oriented version. Originally, Aero Vodochody had intended to develop the L-159 in partnership with Elbit, but the Czech Ministry of Defense instead selected Rockwell Collins to partner on the program.

During the 2010s, Aero Vodochody was engaged in the manufacture of the L-159 advanced light combat aircraft and the Sikorsky S-76 helicopter. It has also an active presence in the aerostructures sector, producing the center wing box of the Alenia C-27J Spartan airlifter, door subassemblies for the Embraer 170 and Embraer 190 airliners, the cockpit of the Sikorsky UH-60 Black Hawk helicopter, gun bay doors for the Boeing F/A-18E/F Super Hornet fighter, subassemblies and various elements of the Airbus A320 family airliner, and fixed leading edge kits for the Boeing 767 airliner. The company is reportedly likely to upgrade the runway at its Vodochody Airport near Prague to international airport standards, allowing it to better serve the low-cost air carriers and charter flights that service Prague.

During July 2014, Aero Vodochody presented the L-39NG programme at the Farnborough Airshow. By April 2015, a partnership had formed between Aero Vodochody, American defence contractor Draken International and engine manufacturer Williams International to undertake the programme and to properly prepare the L-39NG to compete on the North American market. The L-39NG is being developed and marketed in two stages. The L-39NG upgrade program (Stage 1) contains an installation of FJ44-4M engine and optionally the Stage 2 avionics to existing L-39 Albatros. The second phase (Stage 2) represents newly built L-39NG aircraft with the possible use of components from the previous upgrade to Stage 1, once the original airframe reaches the end of its life. The first stage was formally completed om 14 September 2015 with the maiden flight of the L-39NG technology demonstrator (L-39CW). On 20 November 2017, Aero Vodochody announced the completion of development of the L-39CW; on 14 March 2018, they announced that the L-39CW, equipped with both the new engine and the new avionics, had received type certification. The brand new L-39NG aircraft made first flight on December 22, 2018. in September 2020, less than two years later, the aircraft was certified by the Military Aviation Authority of the Ministry of Defence of the Czech Republic.

In September, 2021, Aero Vodochody sale transaction was successfully completed. Based on an agreement signed in July 2021 Hungarian company HSC Aerojet Zrt. became the 100% owner of Aero. In HSC Aerojet Zrt. majority is held by Hungarian businessman Kristóf Szalay-Bobrovniczky and minority is held by Czech company OMNIPOL a.s. The sale also included Vodochody Airport.

Aircraft

See also 
Aero (automobile)
Avia
Beneš-Mráz
Let Kunovice
Letov Kbely
Zlin Aircraft

References

Bibliography

 Fredriksen, John C. International Warbirds: An Illustrated Guide to World Military Aircraft, 1914–2000. ABC-CLIO, 2001. .
 Kiss, Judit. The Defence Industry in East-Central Europe: Restructuring and Conversion. SIPRI, 1997. .
 Lake, Jon. "Aero L-39 Albatross family: Variant Briefing". World Air Power Journal, Volume 43, Winter 2000. London:Aerospace Publishing. pp. 116–131. .

External links

Company website
Company website – English

Aircraft manufacturers of the Czech Republic and Czechoslovakia
Czech brands
Helicopter manufacturers of Czechoslovakia
Helicopter manufacturers of the Czech Republic
Manufacturing companies based in Prague
Vehicle manufacturing companies established in 1919
Motor vehicle manufacturers of Czechoslovakia